Burkovshchina is a rural locality (a village) in Kichmengskoye Rural Settlement, Kichmengsko-Gorodetsky District, Vologda Oblast, Russia. The population was 11 as of 2002.

Geography 
Burkovshchina is located 41 km northeast of Kichmengsky Gorodok (the district's administrative centre) by road. Shemyachkino is the nearest rural locality.

References 

Rural localities in Kichmengsko-Gorodetsky District